Marco Caricchia (circa 1756 – after 1797) was an Italian painter of the late-Baroque period, active mainly in Southern Italy and Rome. He was active mainly in portraits and manuscript illumination.

Life
He was born in Arpino, trained in Rome under Pompeo Batoni.

References

1756 births
Year of death unknown
People from Arpino
18th-century Italian painters
Italian male painters
Italian Baroque painters
18th-century Italian male artists